752 Sulamitis  is an asteroid from the inner regions of the asteroid belt, approximately  in diameter. It is the parent body of the Sulamitis family, a small family of 300 known carbonaceous asteroids. The orbital plane is inclined at an angle of 5.96° to the plane of the ecliptic.

Sulamitis was discovered on 30 April 1913 by Georgian–Russian astronomer Grigory Neujmin at the Simeiz Observatory on the Crimean peninsula, and given the provisional designation . It was named after the Shulamite, a beautiful woman mentioned in the book Solomon's Song of Songs of the Old Testament. The figure is possibly the Queen of Sheba in the Hebrew Bible.

A hydration feature in the spectrum of 752 Sulamitis indicates the surface has undergone aqueous alteration. The same feature appears in most of its family members, suggesting the original body held water in some form.

References

External links 
 Discovery Circumstances: Numbered Minor Planets
 
 

000752
Discoveries by Grigory Neujmin
Named minor planets
19130430